This article contains information about the literary events and publications of 1978.

Events
March 8 – Douglas Adams' comic science fiction series The Hitchhiker's Guide to the Galaxy originates as a radio comedy broadcast on the U.K. BBC Radio 4.
March – Philip Larkin ends his relationships with Maeve Brennan and Betty Mackereth.
April – James Blaylock's first published story, "The Ape-Box Affair", appears in Unearth magazine, pioneering steampunk fiction.
August 1 – Barbara Pym is a guest on Desert Island Discs.
October – The Bookseller/Diagram Prize for Oddest Title of the Year, a humorous award given annually to books with unusual titles, is launched at the Frankfurt Book Fair. The first winner is Proceedings of the Second International Workshop on Nude Mice.
November 15 – Harold Pinter's play Betrayal, inspired by a seven-year clandestine extramarital affair with BBC Television presenter Joan Bakewell, opens at the National Theatre in London, directed by Peter Hall and featuring Penelope Wilton and her husband at this time, Daniel Massey, with Michael Gambon.
December 15 – The Berlin State Library's new Haus Potsdamer Straße is opened in West Berlin's Kulturforum.
unknown date – Antonia White's 1933 novel Frost in May becomes the first in Virago Press's Modern Classics series of reissues of books by neglected women authors, published in the UK.

New books

Fiction
Etel Adnan – Sitt Marie Rose
Srikrishna Alanahalli – Parasangada Gendethimma
Kingsley Amis – Jake's Thing
Martin Amis – Success
Jessica Anderson – Tirra Lirra by the River
Aharon Appelfeld – Badenheim 1939 (באדנהיים עיר נופש)
Richard Bach – Illusions
Beryl Bainbridge – Young Adolf
Thomas Berger – Arthur Rex: A Legendary Novel
Thomas Bernhard – Yes (Ja)
Adolfo Bioy Casares – The Hero of Women (El héroe de las mujeres)
William Peter Blatty – The Ninth Configuration
Charles Bukowski – Women
Anthony Burgess – 1985
Taylor Caldwell – Bright Flows the River
Alejo Carpentier – El arpa y la sombra (The Harp and the Shadow)
Chantal Chawaf – Rougeâtre
John Cheever – The Stories of John Cheever
C. J. Cherryh – Well of Shiuan
Cho Se-hui – The Dwarf (난장이가 쏘아 올린 작은 공, A Dwarf Launches a Little Ball)
Brian Cleeve – Judith
Mary Elizabeth Counselman – Half in Shadow
L. Sprague de Camp
The Best of L. Sprague de Camp
The Great Fetish
Conan the Swordsman (with Lin Carter and Björn Nyberg) 
Samuel R. Delany – Empire: A Visual Novel
Don DeLillo – Running Dog
Nelson DeMille – By the Rivers of Babylon
Phyllis Eisenstein – Born to Exile
J. G. Farrell – The Singapore Grip
Howard Fast – Second Generation
Ken Follett – Eye of the Needle
Alan Dean Foster – Splinter of the Mind's Eye
Ernest J. Gaines – In My Father's House
Jane Gardam – God on the Rocks
Maurice Gee – Plumb (first in trilogy)
Graham Greene – The Human Factor
Donald Hamilton – The Silencers
Harry Harrison – The Stainless Steel Rat Wants You
Roy Heath – The Murderer
James Herbert – The Spear
William Hjortsberg – Falling Angel
Timothy Mo – The Monkey King
John Irving – The World According to Garp
Marshall Jevons – Murder at the Margin
James Jones – Whistle
Ismail Kadare – The Three-Arched Bridge (Ura Me Tri Harqe)
M. M. Kaye – The Far Pavilions
Stephen King
The Stand
Night Shift (collection of short stories including "Children of the Corn")
Christopher Koch – The Year of Living Dangerously
Larry Kramer – Faggots
Judith Krantz – Scruples
Jaan Kross – The Czar's Madman (Keisri hull)
Derek Lambert – The Saint Peter's Plot
Camara Laye – Le Maître de la parole – Kouma Lafôlô Kouma (The Guardian of the Word)
Ursula K. Le Guin – The Eye of the Heron
Madeleine L'Engle – A Swiftly Tilting Planet
Robert Ludlum – The Holcroft Covenant
John D. MacDonald – The Empty Copper Sea
David Malouf – An Imaginary Life
Dambudzo Marechera – The House of Hunger
Ngaio Marsh – Grave Mistake
Richard Matheson – What Dreams May Come
Ian McEwan – The Cement Garden
James A. Michener – Chesapeake
Patrick Modiano – Rue des boutiques obscures (translated as Missing Person)
Alice Munro – Who Do You Think You Are? (The Beggar Maid: Stories of Flo and Rose in U.S.)
Larry Niven – The Magic Goes Away
Tim O'Brien – Going After Cacciato
Andrew J. Offutt – Conan and the Sorcerer
John L. Parker Jr. – Once a Runner
Robert B. Parker – The Judas Goat
Elizabeth Peters – Street of the Five Moons
William Luther Pierce – The Turner Diaries
Belva Plain – Evergreen
Mario Puzo – Fools Die
Mary Renault – The Praise Singer
Ruth Rendell – A Sleeping Life
Hubert Selby Jr. – Requiem for a Dream
Jaswant Singh Kanwal – Lahoo Di Lo (Dawn of the Blood)
Whitley Strieber – The Wolfen
Thomas Sullivan – Diapason
Julian Symons – The Blackheath Poisonings
John Updike – The Coup
Gore Vidal – Kalki
William Wharton – Birdy
Herman Wouk – War and Remembrance
Richard Yates – A Good School
Frank Yerby – Hail the Conquering Hero
Roger Zelazny – The Courts of Chaos

Children and young people
Janet and Allan Ahlberg – Each Peach, Pear, Plum (approximate year)
Alicia Austin – Alicia Austin's Age of Dreams
Judy Blume – Wifey
Raymond Briggs – The Snowman
Roald Dahl – The Enormous Crocodile
Rumer Godden – A Kindle of Kittens
Gwen Grant – Private – Keep Out
David Larkin (with Brian Froud and Alan Lee) – Faeries
Bill Peet – Eli
David Rees – The Exeter Blitz
Seymour Reit (with Roberto Innocenti)
All Kinds of Planes
All Kinds of Ships
All Kinds of Trains
Sails, Rails, and Wings
Louis Sachar – Sideways Stories from Wayside School (first in the Wayside School series of six books)
Rosemary Sutcliff – Song for a Dark Queen
Arnold Wesker – Fatlips: A Story for Children
Arnulf Zitelmann (with Willi Glasauer) – Kleiner Weg (Small Trail)
Roger Hargreaves – Timbuctoo (first twelve of a series of 25 books)

Drama
Miguel M. Abrahão – O Chifrudo
Douglas Adams – The Hitchhiker's Guide to the Galaxy (radio play)
Brian Clark – Whose Life Is It Anyway?
Max Frisch – Tryptichon: Drei szenische Bilder (Triptych)
David Hare – Plenty
Arthur Kopit – Wings
Ira Levin – Deathtrap
Mary O'Malley – Once a Catholic
Heiner Müller – Germania Death in Berlin (first performance)
Harold Pinter – Betrayal
Sam Shepard – Buried Child
Martin Sherman – Bent
Victoria Wood – Talent

Poetry

Maya Angelou – And Still I Rise
Robert Minhinnick – A Thread in the Maze
Luis Alberto Spinetta – Guitarra Negra (Black Guitar)
John Tripp – Collected Poems

Non-fiction
Hannah Arendt (died 1975) – The Life of the Mind
Gisela Bleibtreu-Ehrenberg – Tabu Homosexualität
Roger Caron – Go-Boy! Memories of a Life Behind Bars
Lord David Cecil – A Portrait of Jane Austen
Charlotte Chandler – Hello, I Must Be Going!
Beth Chatto – The Dry Garden
Christina Crawford – Mommie Dearest
Gerald Durrell – The Garden of the Gods
Don E. Fehrenbacher – The Dred Scott Case: Its Significance in American Law and Politics
John Gall – Systemantics
H. R. Haldeman – The Ends of Power
Mollie Katzen – Moosewood Cookbook
Mary Midgley – Beast and Man: The Roots of Human Nature
New York International Bible Society – Holy Bible, New International Version (translated into modern American English)
Richard Nixon – The Memoirs of Richard Nixon
M. Scott Peck – The Road Less Travelled
David Rorvik – In his Image: The Cloning of a Man
Edward Said – Orientalism

Births
February 1 – Arno Camenisch, Swiss writer
April 4  - Robison Wells, American novelist
July 23 – Lauren Groff, American novelist and short story writer
October 24 – Kei Miller, Jamaican-born poet and fiction writer
November 2 - Ally Condie, American young-adult and middle grade novelist
unknown dates
Filippo Bologna, Italian novelist and screenwriter
David Llewellyn, Welsh screenwriter
Samanta Schweblin, Argentine fiction writer
Rachel Trezise, Welsh novelist and short story writer

Deaths
January 12 – Robert Harbin, South African-born author of books on magic (born 1908)
March 1 – Paul Scott, English novelist, playwright and poet (born 1920)
March 24 – Leigh Brackett, American science fiction writer (born 1915)
April 14 – F. R. Leavis, English academic literary critic (born 1895)
May 1 – Sylvia Townsend Warner, English poet and novelist (born 1893)
May 12 – Louis Zukofsky, American modernist poet (born 1904)
June 11 – Carola Oman, English historical novelist, biographer and children's writer (born 1897)
June 18 – Walter C. Alvarez, American medical author (born 1884)
August 11 – Berta Ruck, Indian-born Welsh romantic novelist (born 1878)
August 28 – Robert Shaw, English-born actor, novelist and playwright (born 1927)
September 3 – Basil Willey, English academic literary critic (died 1897)
September 9 – Hugh MacDiarmid (pen name of Christopher Murray Grieve), Scottish poet, journalist and essayist (born 1892)
September 11 – Georgi Markov, Bulgarian dissident writer, broadcaster, playwright (born 1929)
September 15 – Edmund Crispin (Robert Bruce Montgomery), English crime writer and composer (born 1921)
September 28 – Pope John Paul I (Albino Luciani), Italian author of Illustrissimi (born 1912)
November 5 – N. Crevedia, Romanian poet, novelist and journalist (born 1902)
November 11 – Helena Boguszewska, Polish writer, columnist and a social activist (born 1883)
November 15 – Margaret Mead, American cultural anthropologist and author (born 1901)

Awards
Nobel Prize for Literature: Isaac Bashevis Singer
Bookseller/Diagram Prize for Oddest Title of the Year is first awarded. The winner is Proceedings of the Second International Workshop on Nude Mice.

Canada
See 1978 Governor General's Awards for a complete list of winners and finalists for those awards.

France
Prix Goncourt: Patrick Modiano, Rue des boutiques obscures
Prix Médicis French: Georges Perec, La Vie mode d'emploi
Prix Médicis International: Aleksandr Zinovyev, L'Avenir radieux – Russia

Spain
Miguel de Cervantes Prize: Dámaso Alonso

United Kingdom
Booker Prize: Iris Murdoch, The Sea, The Sea
Carnegie Medal for children's literature: David Rees, The Exeter Blitz
Cholmondeley Award: Christopher Hope, Leslie Norris, Peter Reading, D.M. Thomas, R.S. Thomas
Eric Gregory Award: Ciarán Carson, Peter Denman, Christopher Reid, Paul Wilkins, Martyn A. Ford, James Sutherland-Smith
James Tait Black Memorial Prize for fiction: Maurice Gee, Plumb
James Tait Black Memorial Prize for biography: Robert Gittings, The Older Hardy

United States
American Academy of Arts and Letters Gold Medal for Fiction, Peter Taylor
Nebula Award: Vonda McIntyre, Dreamsnake
Newbery Medal for children's literature: Katherine Paterson, Bridge to Terabithia
Pulitzer Prize for Drama: Donald L. Coburn, The Gin Game
Pulitzer Prize for Fiction: James Alan McPherson, Elbow Room
Pulitzer Prize for Poetry: Howard Nemerov, Collected Poems

Elsewhere
Miles Franklin Award: Jessica Anderson, Tirra Lirra by the River
Premio Nadal: Germán Sánchez Espeso, Narciso
Viareggio Prize: Antonio Altomonte, Dopo il presidente

References

1978 books
Years of the 20th century in literature